Jean-Pierre Abelin (born 3 September 1950 in Poitiers, Vienne) is a French politician.

Jean-Pierre Abelin is the son of Pierre Abelin.

French National Assembly
He was a member of  the French National Assembly from 1978 to 1981, then 1986 to 1988, and from 1993 to 2012, for various constituencies of Vienne, most recently the 4th constituency.

He was a member of the New Centre.

He was a member of the Economic, Environmental and Regional Planning Committee.

European Parliament
Abelin also was a Member of the European Parliament, between 1984 and 1989, in the European People's Party.

References

External links
Official website

1950 births
Living people
People from Poitiers
Politicians from Nouvelle-Aquitaine
Centre of Social Democrats politicians
Union for French Democracy politicians
The Centrists politicians
Union of Democrats and Independents politicians
Deputies of the 6th National Assembly of the French Fifth Republic
Deputies of the 8th National Assembly of the French Fifth Republic
Deputies of the 10th National Assembly of the French Fifth Republic
Deputies of the 11th National Assembly of the French Fifth Republic
Deputies of the 12th National Assembly of the French Fifth Republic
Deputies of the 13th National Assembly of the French Fifth Republic
Mayors of places in Nouvelle-Aquitaine
People from Châtellerault
Paris Dauphine University alumni